Jorge Gerardo Brion (born 23 April 1933) is a Curaçaoan footballer. He competed in the men's tournament at the 1952 Summer Olympics.

References

External links
 
 

1933 births
Living people
Curaçao footballers
Netherlands Antilles international footballers
Olympic footballers of the Netherlands Antilles
Footballers at the 1952 Summer Olympics
Place of birth missing (living people)
Association football forwards